Pauline Hanson's One Nation (PHON or ONP), also known as One Nation or One Nation Party, is a right-wing populist political party in Australia. It is led by Pauline Hanson.

One Nation had electoral success in the late 1990s, before suffering an extended decline after 2001. Its leaders have been accused, charged, and later acquitted, of fraud, and the party has suffered from numerous defections, resignations and other internal scandals which culminated in Hanson's resignation from the party. One Nation's policies and platform have been much criticised as being racist and xenophobic. Nevertheless, One Nation has had a profound impact on debates on multiculturalism and immigration in Australia. Following Hanson's return as leader and the 2016 federal election, the party gained 4 seats in the Senate, including one for Hanson herself, in Queensland.

One Nation was founded in 1997, by member of parliament Pauline Hanson and her advisors David Ettridge and David Oldfield after Hanson was disendorsed as a federal candidate for the Liberal Party of Australia. The disendorsement came before the 1996 federal election following comments she made about Indigenous Australians. Oldfield, a Councillor on Manly Council in suburban Sydney and at one time an employee of Liberal minister Tony Abbott, was the organisational architect of the party. Hanson sat as an independent for one year before forming Pauline Hanson's One Nation.

Arguing that other political parties are out of touch with mainstream Australia, One Nation runs on a broadly populist and nationalist platform. It promises to drastically reduce immigration and to abolish "divisive and discriminatory policies ... attached to Aboriginal and multicultural affairs." Condemning multiculturalism as a "threat to the very basis of the Australian culture, identity and shared values". During its inception, One Nation rallied against Liberal government immigration and multicultural policies which, it argued, were leading to "the Asianisation of Australia."

The party denounces economic rationalism and globalisation. Adopting strong protectionist policies, One Nation advocates the restoration of import tariffs, a revival of Australia's manufacturing industry, and an increase in support for small business and the rural sector.

History

1997: One Nation founded

Shortly after being elected to federal parliament, Hanson formed the One Nation party with co-founders David Oldfield and David Ettridge. During the formative days of One Nation, Oldfield was employed by Liberal Party backbench MP Tony Abbott as a political advisor. One Nation was launched on 11 April 1997, at an event held in Ipswich, Queensland. The party was officially registered by the Australian Electoral Commission (AEC) on 27 June.

1998: first elections

The 1998 Queensland state election produced One Nation's greatest electoral success with the ALP winning 44 seats to be the largest party in the Assembly, the Coalition winning 32 seats and One Nation winning 11 seats. During the campaign polling for One Nation lead to commentators saying One Nation might secure the balance of power in a hung parliament. During the campaign, all three major political parties suffered a decline in voter support due to One Nation having entered the fray. The National Party saw an 11.1% drop in support, their Liberal Party coalition partners lost 6.7% and Labor's vote dropped 4.0%. To the surprise of many pundits, the One Nation Party received 22.7% of the first preference vote, giving them the second largest voter turnout for any party in Queensland during the 1998 election. One Nation drew the majority of its support from regional and rural Queensland, winning 9 of its 11 seats in rural and regional electorates. Subsequently, the One Nation contingent in the Queensland Parliament split, with dissident members forming the rival City-Country Alliance in late 1999.

At the 1998 federal election, Hanson contested the new seat of Blair after a redistribution effectively split Oxley in half. Hanson lost to Liberal candidate Cameron Thompson, and the One Nation candidate in Oxley lost the seat to ALP candidate Bernie Ripoll. One Nation candidate Heather Hill was elected as a senator for Queensland. Hill's eligibility to sit as a senator was successfully challenged in Sue v Hill under the Australian Constitution on the basis that she had failed to renounce her childhood British citizenship, despite being a naturalised Australian citizen. The seat went to the party's Len Harris following a recount.

Political scientists Ian McAllister and Clive Bean, in an analysis of the 1998 federal election, found that although it was assumed that One Nation supporters came from a traditionally conservative demographic, instead:

Within a year of One Nation's electoral success, 3 of the 11 Queensland MPs elected had quit the party claiming the leadership had too much control over the party.

Internal disputes and claims of corruption 
The party was affected by internal divisions and has split several times.  Lawsuits involving ex-members did eventually force Hanson to repay approximately $500,000 of public funding won at the 1998 Queensland election amid claims by Abbott that the party was fraudulently registered. Abbott established a trust fund called "Australians for Honest Politics Trust" to help bankroll civil court cases against the Party. The suits alleged that the party was undemocratically constituted in order to concentrate all power in the hands of three people—Hanson, Ettridge and Oldfield (in particular Oldfield)—and that it technically had only two members: Ettridge and Hanson. Even though Hanson's fraud charges were dropped, the Electoral Commission of Queensland never reimbursed Hanson for the monies that they collected from the claim.

The first Annual General Meeting of the One Nation party was held in April 1999, which critic Paul Reynolds said demonstrated that One Nation lacked organisation.

At the 1999 New South Wales state election, David Oldfield was elected to the New South Wales Legislative Council. In October 2000, Hanson expelled Oldfield from the party after a disagreement. His expulsion created even more instability in a party which was constantly embroiled in scandal and internal strife. Oldfield attacked Hanson publicly, saying that "everything including her maiden speech and every word of any consequence that she's said since, has actually been written for her". Oldfield engineered a split within the party, creating One Nation NSW, in 2001. The new party took advantage of electoral party registration laws to register itself as a political party under the 'One Nation' name with the NSW electoral commission, and achieved registration in April 2002.

At the 2001 Western Australian state election One Nation won three seats in the state, however the party was reduced to three seats the same year at the 2001 Queensland state election. During the 2001 Australian federal election, the party's vote fell from 9% to 5.5%. Hanson failed in her bid to win a Senate seat from Queensland, despite polling a strong 10% of the primary vote. Hanson also failed to win a seat in the New South Wales Legislative Council.

Electoral fraud charges 
In 2001, disendorsed One Nation candidate Terry Sharples accused the party of not having the 500 members needed for registration, and called for the party to be deregistered, which was carried by the Supreme Court. Hanson appealed the verdict but was unsuccessful. Hanson appeared before the Brisbane Magistrates Court to face charges of electoral fraud, that same year. Hanson pleaded not guilty to the charges, claiming that she was being subjected to "a political witch-hunt." While court hearings proceeded, Hanson ran for a seat in the NSW Upper House as an independent, but only received 1.9 per cent of the vote.

Both Ettridge and Hanson were found guilty of fraudulently registering One Nation and obtaining more than $500,000 from the AEC, in 2003. Crown lawyers accused them both of falsely claiming more than 500 people were party members when they were not truly members. Hanson was sentenced to three years in jail, stating outside the court that the verdict was "Rubbish, I'm not guilty... it's a joke".

It was later disclosed that Abbott had been working behind the scenes to take Ettridge and Hanson down, meeting with several disgruntled One Nation members including Sharples. November 6 that same year Hanson was released from prison after successfully appealing her conviction and being acquitted on all counts.

2004–2013: Electoral decline 
At the 2004 Queensland state election, One Nation polled less than 5% of the vote and its sole elected representative, Rosa Lee Long, acted as an independent. One Nation attempted to defend its Queensland Senate seat at the 2004 federal election, but lost it (effectively to the National Party). Len Harris's Senate term expired on 30 June 2005.

On 8 February 2005, One Nation lost federal party status but was re-registered in time for the 2007 federal election. It still had state parties in Queensland and New South Wales. Subsequently, it created another state party in Western Australia. In the February 2005 Western Australian state election, the One Nation vote collapsed.

In the 2006 South Australian state election, six One Nation candidates stood for the lower house. Their highest levels of the primary vote was 4.1% in the district of Hammond and 2.7% in Goyder, with the other four hovering around 1%. They attracted 0.8% (7559 votes) of the upper house vote. One Nation consequently won no seats in that election.

In the 2006 Queensland state election, the party contested four of 89 seats, and its vote collapsed. It suffered a swing of 4.3% to be left with just 0.6% of the vote. Its only remaining seat in the state (and country), Tablelands, was retained with an increased majority by Rosa Lee Long. Tablelands was abolished prior to the 2009 Queensland state election, with Lee Long failing to win the seat of Dalrymple.

In the 2012 Queensland state election the party unsuccessfully contested six seats. The party received only 2,525 first preference votes (representing 0.1% of the total cast) across the state.

2013–2015: Hanson's return as leader 
Hanson rejoined One Nation as a rank-and-file member, in 2013. Later that year she unsuccessfully contested the Senate for New South Wales at the 2013 federal election. In 2014, Hanson was reappointed as leader by the One Nation executive. She contested the seat of Lockyer for the party at the January 2015 Queensland state election, falling 114 votes short of defeating sitting Liberal National Party member Ian Rickuss.

In July 2015, Hanson announced that the party was renamed the original "Pauline Hanson's One Nation" and contested in the Senate for Queensland at the 2016 federal election.

In the lead up to the 2016 election, Hanson arranged a "Fed Up" tour that began in July 2015 as part of her re-election campaign, flying in a private plane to Rockhampton prior to a Reclaim Australia rally, piloted by James Ashby.

2016–present: return to federal politics 

At the 2016 federal election the party polled 4.3% (+3.8) of the nationwide primary vote in the Senate. Only Queensland polled higher for the party than their nationwide percentage − the party polled 9.2% (+8.6) of the primary vote in that state. Pauline Hanson (QLD) and three other One Nation candidates − Malcolm Roberts (QLD), Brian Burston (NSW) and Rod Culleton (WA) were elected to the Senate. Elected to the 3rd Queensland Senate spot, as per convention Hanson is serving a six-year term while the three other One Nation Senators who were elected in the last half of spots were appointed to three-year terms. Culleton was stripped of his seat in January 2017 after he was declared bankrupt. In March 2017, the High Court ruled that Culleton's election to the Senate was invalid in any event because of a criminal conviction in New South Wales. After a court-ordered recount, Culleton was replaced by the second candidate on the WA list, Peter Georgiou.

Resignations, disendorsements and ineligibility
Rod Culleton (WA) left the party in December 2016, after months of legal troubles and party infighting to sit as an independent bringing the number of party senators to 3.  On 3 February 2017, the High Court of Australia ruled that Culleton's election was invalid due to a conviction for which he was subject to being sentenced at the time of the election, notwithstanding that the conviction was subsequently annulled.  The resulting vacancy was filled by a recount of the votes at the election, which resulted in Peter Georgiou taking the seat and returning the One Nation representation in the Senate to four.

During the 2017 Western Australian state election, several One Nation candidates either quit or were disendorsed. Dane Sorensen provided a copy of the party's Western Australian "candidate agreement" form for this election, which all candidates had to sign. It includes an "administration fee" of $250,000 if an elected candidate subsequently leaves the party. One Nation previously formed a 'conservative bloc' with the Liberal Democratic Party and Shooters, Fishers and Farmers Party in the Western Australia Legislative Council.

On 27 October 2017, the full High Court, as Court of Disputed Returns, ruled that Malcolm Roberts had been ineligible to be elected to the Parliament. On 13 November, Senator Fraser Anning took Roberts' seat after a Senate recount. However, on the same day Anning left the party to become an Independent.

On 14 June 2018, Senator Brian Burston announced his resignation from the party to sit as an independent, following a month-long clash with Hanson centred around the Turnbull Government's corporate tax cuts, on which Hanson had reversed her position. This reduced the party to two senators, with Hanson remaining the only member of One Nation elected at the 2016 Federal election.

Hanson wears a burqa into the Senate
Hanson drew widespread condemnation when she wore the full Islamic dress into Senate Question Time, before calling for the burqa to be banned in Australia. Audible gasps of shock were heard in the parliament. Liberal party Senator and Attorney-General of Australia, George Brandis condemned Hanson's actions, declaring to the parliament that "To ridicule that community, to drive it into a corner, to mock its religious garments is an appalling thing to do. I would ask you to reflect on that". Senator Brandis received applause and praise from all sides of parliament for his response.

"it is OK to be white"
On 15 October 2018, a Senate motion brought by the party stating "it is OK to be white" was defeated 31–28 in a vote. The government expressed regret at the support the vote received, blaming it to an administrative error in which its senators were mistakenly instructed to vote positively. Critics noted that the phrase "it's OK to be white" has been associated with white supremacist rhetoric.

Mark Latham joins One Nation
Former Labor Party leader Mark Latham joined the party in November 2018 as leader for New South Wales. He successfully contested a seat in the Legislative Council, winning it in March 2019.

James Ashby controversies
On 22 May 2017, a new scandal arose when a taped conversation between Hanson and political advisor James Ashby was released. The tape showed that Ashby had supported charging One Nation candidates inflated prices for campaign materials.

In March 2019, One Nation was the subject of a two-part Al Jazeera documentary series asserting that the party was soliciting financial assistance from the National Rifle Association of America and Koch Industries in order to change Australian gun control laws. Al Jazeera used an undercover reporter posing as a gun rights advocate. In response, One Nation leader Pauline Hanson condemned the documentary as a "hit piece" by a Qatar government backed news agency and announced that she had filed a complaint with the Australian Security Intelligence Organisation. Similar sentiments were echoed by the One Nation officials, James Ashby and Steve Dickson, who were featured in the documentary. In response to the documentary, the Australian Electoral Commission said that none of the activities shown in the documentary violated section 326 of the Commonwealth Electoral Act 1918 since they occurred overseas.

2019 election and Family Court claims

At the May 2019 federal election One Nation polled 5.40% (up 1.12%) for the nationwide Senate primary vote. The party polled higher than their national vote in Queensland, taking 10.27% up 1.08%, of the primary vote in the senate.

The PHON House of Representatives candidate for the Division of O'Connor, Dean Smith, who won 8.4% (7,252) votes, was in December of the same year a target of recruitment for Neo-Nazi group The Base. In secretly recorded tapes of his "interview" by a recruiter, Smith tells of his hatred of immigrants and his wish to "save the race". He tells the recruiter that he had become "more and more extreme and passionate about my views", and disillusioned with One Nation and the possibility of a political solution. However, he was deemed too great a risk for The Base because of his political profile, so was not admitted into their ranks.

Also in 2019, Hanson received widespread condemnation in the Australian media after claiming that domestic violence victims routinely lie to the Family Court. The Law Council of Australia called for the abandonment of a federal parliamentary inquiry into the family law system, citing concerns that the hearings were being used by Hanson for political purposes to undermine domestic violence claims made by women.

2022 elections
In April 2022, it was "formally confirmed" that during the 2022 South Australian state election that One Nation's Sarah Game won a seat within the South Australia legislative council (upper house) making history as One Nation first member of SA parliament.

In April 2022, Queensland MP George Christensen who had represented the division of Dawson for the Liberal National party announced he had joined One Nation with the intention of contesting for the Senate in the upcoming Federal election. 

One Nation ran 149 candidates in the 2022 federal election; the only seats where they did not are inner Melbourne-based Higgins and the rural Queensland seat of Kennedy, held by Bob Katter. Hanson's One Nation party has been criticised for running "ghost candidates" in several electorates for the 2022 federal election, who are not campaigning in the lead-up to the election and who have no online presence. Additionally, many do not live in the electorates they are listed as being the candidates for. Despite this, the AEC has said that it is not against the rules. One Nation had promised in the lead-up to the election that it would run candidates in all seats.

In December 2022, One Nation got its first Victorian MLC with Rikkie-Lee Tyrrell winning a seat during the 2022 Victorian state election within the Victorian legislative council (upper house).

2023
On 17 January 2023, New South Wales MP, Tania Mihailuk, announced her intention to join the party, previously representing the electoral district of Bankstown for the Labor Party before becoming and independent. Mihailuk has announced that she will run for a seat in the Legislative Council at the 2023 state election.

State and territory branches

Ideology
One Nation's policies and ideology have been described as based on ultranationalism, populism, and opposition to high levels of immigration. Its policies have been also described as nationalist, national-conservative, socially conservative, conservative, and protectionist. Its political position has been described as right-wing and far-right.

Writer Hans-Georg Betz described One Nation and Pauline Hanson in 2019 as among "the first prominent radical right-wing populist entrepreneurs to mobilize popular resentment against a very specific target — the intellectual elite" and that in the twenty first century where "today’s army of self-styled commentators and pundits summarily dismissing radical right-wing populist voters as uncouth, uneducated plebeians intellectually incapable of understanding the blessings of progressive identity politics, Hanson’s anti-elite rhetoric anno 1996 proved remarkably prescient, if rather tame." Betz also argued that One Nation differs from European right-wing parties by focusing on its own brand of populism which he termed Hansonism based on Hanson's personality and debates unique to Australian society. Political scientist Ian McAllister argues the current version of One Nation from 2017 does not have much in the way of policy beyond an "anti-establishment stance" while others have argued it has changed to focus its policies on opposition to Islam.

In its early years, One Nation's policies were said to be synonymous with opposition to affirmative action for Aboriginal communities. Some key themes of Pauline Hanson’s 1998 maiden speech were opposition to what she said were increasingly high rates of immigration from Asian countries and an argument for economic protectionist policies. Former Australian Prime Minister Paul Keating denounced Hanson in a speech in 1996, saying that she projected "the ugly face of racism" and was "dangerously divisive and deeply hurtful to many of her fellow Australians." Hanson and One Nation have disputed accusations of racism and argue that the main parties are out of touch with many Australians on the issues of immigration, asylum seekers and multiculturalism, and have ended up adopting some of the policies One Nation initially called for. Milton Osborne noted in 1999 that research indicated Hanson's initial supporters did not cite immigration as a major reason for their support for One Nation, but instead they were most concerned about economic issues and unemployment. A 2001 study showed that One Nation had extensive informal ties and received endorsements from far-right movements due to the party requiring "the support of those groups in establishing the party and because of a convergence of interests".

Policies

Immigration and asylum
One Nation says that whilst it recognises the positive contributions of immigrants to Australian life, it supports a general reduction in the levels of net migration to "closer to the 20th century average of 70,000", to stabilise population numbers, citing economic, cultural and environmental arguments against mass migration. The party also calls for a travel ban on certain countries, similar to one enacted by the Trump administration in the United States, in order to combat radical Islam and prevent the immigration of people the party argues are more likely to reject Australian values and promote violent extremism. The party also supports making English Australia's official language and supports stronger assimilation of immigrants. One Nation also seeks to withdraw Australia from the United Nations Refugee Convention and is opposed to the UN Global Compact on Migration. Due to these statements, One Nation has been described as anti-Islam.

Following the end of lockdowns in Australia as a result of COVID-19 pandemic in Australia, the party has voiced support for establishing a zero-net immigration policy, similar to the one Australia had introduced during the pandemic. One Nation supports permitting only highly skilled migrants from culturally cohesive countries to settle in Australia.

The economy and employment
One Nation supports a broadly protectionist platform, saying that it would review free trade agreements and revoke any "that are not in Australia's best interest." It is opposed to foreign ownership of Australian agricultural land and businesses. Wishing to prioritise jobs for Australian nationals, it would investigate "the abuse of foreign work visas."

One Nation backed the Turnbull Government's controversial 2018 corporate tax cuts.

Domestic policies
The party argues for the introduction of Citizens Initiated Referenda (CIR) and states it will review the salaries and pensions paid to Australian politicians. In 2021, the Senate approved a motion tabled by Pauline Hanson which called on the federal government to reject the teaching of critical race theory in Australian schools. It also supports a ban on wearing the burqa in public spaces. One Nation has backed Hanson's comments regarding downplaying scientific consensus on climate change. During the debate on the Marriage Amendment (Definition and Religious Freedoms) Act 2017 which would legalise same-sex marriage in Australia, Hanson and other members of One Nation expressed their opposition to same-sex marriage. However, Hanson also stated the party would not take an official stance on same-sex marriage and that One Nation senators would be allowed a free vote on the issue.

Law and order
One Nation claims it will increase rehabilitation facilities for drug addicts and introduce life sentences for drug traffickers, Pauline Hanson has previously voiced her support of medicinal cannabis but strong objection to recreational drug usage and opposition to pill testing. The party supports responsible gun ownership but wants tougher sentences for arms traffickers. The party also supports one law for all Australians and is opposed to any form of sharia law in Australia.

Welfare
One Nation is in favour of a substantial increase in the aged pension and disability support pension. It was reported in 2016 that One Nation had voted with the Liberal government on a number of welfare cuts.

Multinationals
The party would move foreign-owned multinationals out of the corporation tax system and into a transactions based system, saying that too many of them pay no tax on profits made in Australia.

COVID-19 vaccines 

Many politicians, commentators and scientists claim that One Nation senators have spread misinformation and conspiracies on the effectiveness and scientific basis of COVID-19 vaccines. One Nation opposes vaccine mandates, but denies being against vaccinations. However, in 2021, One Nation senator Mark Latham said that vaccinated people should be exempt from Sydney's COVID-19 lockdown.

Climate change 

One Nation senators are frequent critics of any action on climate change and have called climate science a ‘scam’. One Nation has spread debunked conspiracy theories about climate change not occurring or being part of a plot by the United Nations.

Election results

Federal

New South Wales

Victoria

Queensland

Western Australia

South Australia

Northern Territory

Maps

Leaders

Federal
Unlike the Queensland state leadership, the changes of the Federal leadership of the party were largely undocumented (besides Hanson's terms), due to previously having low media attention and confusion of the name of office titles within the party. This list comprises the leaders, most definite, of the party.

In August 2017 the party's constitution was changed, so that Hanson would be party President for as long as she may wish, and to choose her successor, who may also continue until resignation.

New South Wales

Queensland

South Australia

Tasmania

Victoria

Western Australia

Members of parliament

Current MPs

Federal Parliament

New South Wales
 Mark Latham MLC (2019–present)
 Tania Mihailuk MP (Bankstown, 2023–present)
 Rod Roberts MLC (2019–present)

Victoria
 Rikkie-Lee Tyrrell MLC (2022–present)

Queensland
 Stephen Andrew MLA (Mirani, 2017–present)

South Australia
 Sarah Game MLC (2022–present)

Former MPs

Federal Parliament
Senator-elect Heather Hill (Queensland 1998–1999), elected in 1998 and retrospectively disqualified in 1999 after being found ineligibile due to her dual citizenship.
Senator Len Harris (Queensland 1999–2005), appointed after the disqualification of Heather Hill.
Senator Brian Burston (New South Wales, 2016–2017), elected at the 2016 election). Resigned after falling out with Pauline Hanson and joined the United Australia Party in 2017. 
Senator Rod Culleton (Western Australia, 2016), elected at the 2016 election) but retrospectively disqualified after being found to have had a larceny charge in New South Wales at the time of the election.
Senator Peter Georgiou (Western Australia, 2017–2019), appointed after the disqualification of Rod Culleton.
Senator Fraser Anning (Queensland, 2017–2019), appointed after the disqualification of Malcolm Roberts). Anning left the party the same day he was sworn in, later became an Independent and then formed his own party Conservative National Party.

New South Wales
David Oldfield MLC (1999–2007), formed One Nation NSW in 2000, but became an independent in 2004.

Queensland
 Bill Feldman MLA (Caboolture, 1998–2001, formed City Country Alliance in 1999, leader of One Nation in Queensland from 1998 to 1999)
 Jeff Knuth MLA (Burdekin, 1998–2001; became an independent in 1999, formed Country Party Queensland later that year, and joined the City Country Alliance in 2000, rejoined One Nation in 2014, parliamentary whip of One Nation from 1998 to 1999)
 Dorothy Pratt MLA (Barambah 1998–2001, later Nanango, 2001–2012, became an independent in 1999)
 Harry Black MLA (Whitsunday, 1998–2001, joined City Country Alliance in 1999)
 David Dalgleish MLA (Hervey Bay, 1998–2001, joined City Country Alliance in 1999)
 John Kingston MLA (Maryborough, 1998–2003, became an independent in 1999)
 Shaun Nelson MLA (Tablelands, 1998–2001, became an independent in 1999)
 Jack Paff MLA (Ipswich West, 1998–2001, joined City Country Alliance in 1999)
 Peter Prenzler MLA (Lockyer, 1998–2001, joined City Country Alliance in 1999)
 Charles Rappolt MLA (Mulgrave, 1998)
 Ken Turner MLA (Thuringowa, 1998–2001, became an independent in 1999)
 Bill Flynn MLA (Lockyer, 2001–2004, leader of One Nation in Queensland from 2001 to 2004)
 Elisa Roberts MLA (Gympie, 2001–2006, became an independent in 2002)
 Rosa Lee Long MLA (Tablelands, 2001–2009, leader of One Nation in Queensland from 2002 to 2009, national leader of One Nation from 2004 to 2013)
 Steve Dickson MLA (Buderim, 2017, defected from the Liberal National Party in January 2017)

Western Australia
 John Fischer MLC (Mining and Pastoral, 2001–2005, became an independent in 2004, leader of One Nation in Western Australia from 2001 to 2004, national leader of One Nation from 2002 to 2004)
 Frank Hough MLC (Agricultural, 2001–2005, became an independent in 2004, joined New Country Party later that year, leader of One Nation in Western Australia from 2004 to 2004)
 Paddy Embry MLC (South West, 2001–2005, became an independent in 2003, joined New Country Party in 2004)
 Charles Smith MLC (East Metropolitan, 2017–2019, became an independent in 2019 then joined the Western Australia Party, continuing his service as MLC until 2021).
 Colin Tincknell MLC (South West, 2017–2021)
 Robin Scott MLC (Mining and Pastoral, 2017–2021)

Donors 
A 2019 report found that Pauline Hanson's One Nation Party had received over $6,000 in disclosed donations from pro-gun groups during the 2011-2018 period, with concerns these donations threatened to compromise Australia's safety by undermining gun control laws.

See also

Hansonism
Conservatism in Australia
 Pauline Hanson's One Nation – South Australia
 Pauline Hanson's One Nation – New South Wales
True Blue Crew, a far-right group whose members have been involved with Pauline Hanson's One Nation

Footnotes

References

Further reading 
 Abbott, Tony; Adams, Phillip; Brett, Judith; Brunton, Ron; Fraser, Malcolm; Goot, Murray; Grattan, Michelle; Kelly, Paul; Kingston, Margo; Lake, Marilyn; McGuinness, P.P.; Reynolds, Henry; Richardson, Graham; Rothwell, Nicolas; Sheridan, Greg; Wooldridge, Michael; (1998), Two Nations. The Causes and Effects of the Rise of the One Nation Party in Australia, Bookman Press, Melbourne (Victoria) .
 Balson, Scott (2000), Inside One Nation. The inside story on a people's party born to fail, Interactive Presentations, Mt Crosby News, Queensland. .
 Campbell, Graeme and Uhlmann, Mark (1995), Australia Betrayed. How Australian democracy has been undermined and our naive trust betrayed, Foundation Press, Victoria Park, Western Australia. .
 Davis, Rex and Stimson, Robert (1998), 'Disillusionment and disenchantment at the fringe: explaining the geography of the One Nation Party vote at the Queensland election,' People and Place, Vol. 6, No. 3, pp. 69–82.
 Dodd, Helen J (1997). Pauline. The Hanson Phenomenon, Boolarong Press, Moorooka, Queensland. .
 Ettridge, David (2004), Consider Your Verdict, New Holland Publishers, Frenchs Forest, New South Wales. .
 Grant, Bligh (ed.) (1997), Pauline Hanson. One Nation and Australian Politics, University of New England Press, Armidale, New South Wales. .
 Hanson, Pauline (2007), Untamed and Unashamed – Pauline Hanson's autobiography, Jo-Jo Publishing, Docklands, Victoria. .
 Jayasuriya, Laksiri and Pookong, Kee (1999), The Asianisation of Australia? Some Facts about the Myths,  Melbourne University Press, Carlton South, Victoria. 
 Jupp, James (1998), 'Populism in the land of Oz,' in Meanjin, Vol.57, No.4, pp. 740–747.
 Kingston, Margo (1999), Off the Rails. The Pauline Hanson Trip, Allen and Unwin, St Leonards, New South Wales. .
 Leach, Michael; Stokes, Geoffrey; Ward, Ian; (eds.) (2000), The Rise and Fall of One Nation, University of Queensland Press, St Lucia, Queensland. .
 Mackay, Hugh (1999), Turning Point. Australians Choosing Their Future, Pan Macmillan, Sydney, New South Wales, Ch. 24, 'Xenophobia and Politics. Why Hanson was good for us.' .
 Merritt, George J (1997), Pauline Hanson. The Truth, St George Publications, Parkholme, South Australia. .
 Pasquarelli, John (1998), The Pauline Hanson Story by the Man Who Knows, New Holland Publishers, Frenchs Forest, New South Wales. .

External links
One Nation official website
NSW branch website
Inside One Nation
How the Victorian branch imploded

 
Political parties established in 1997
Conservative parties in Australia
Right-wing politics in Australia
Anti-Asian sentiment in Oceania
Australian nationalist parties
Criticism of multiculturalism
Anti-immigration politics in Australia
Right-wing populist parties
Anti-Islam sentiment in Australia
National conservative parties
1997 establishments in Australia
Political parties in Queensland
Pauline Hanson
Climate change denial
Right-wing parties